Nashik Airport  is a domestic airport and an Indian Air Force base serving the city of Nashik, Maharashtra, India. It is owned by Hindustan Aeronautics Limited (HAL), which uses the airport primarily to develop, test and build aircraft for the Indian Armed Forces. It is home to a maintenance station of the Indian Air Force and also supports widebody commercial cargo services. A new passenger terminal was inaugurated on 3 March 2014. It serves the Nashik Metropolitan Region (NMR) as well as the North Maharashtra Region.

History
The airport was built in 1964, when Hindustan Aeronautics Limited (HAL)'s Aircraft Division at Nashik commenced licensed manufacturing of the fighter aircraft, with the MiG-21FL. Other aircraft manufactured here include MiG-21M, MiG-21 BIS, MiG-27 M and Su-30 MKI aircraft.

Kingfisher Airlines commenced scheduled services to Mumbai in 2008, but ended in November 2009 due to poor response. HAL announced the launch of commercial air cargo operations from 
the airport on 20 September 2011. The cargo services are managed by HALCON, a joint working group between HAL and Container Corporation of India (CONCOR) along with Clarion Solutions. The airport is capable of handling large aircraft like the Antonov AN-124s after having creating additional parking space and medical facilities. Clarion Solutions is the cargo terminal operator.

In 2011, HAL signed a Memorandum of Understanding (MoU) with the Government of Maharashtra for an upgradation of the airport. This involves a passenger terminal worth ₹ 84 crores. The Government of Maharashtra paid ₹ 74 crores of the terminal project cost and HAL funded the remaining ₹ 10 crore. After coming on the Directorate General of Civil Aviation (DGCA)'s air map, HAL is now in the process of appointing a private company to develop, to operate and maintain the airport terminal at the airport on a revenue sharing basis.
Scheduled passenger air services to Nashik was revived after a gap of eight years when Air Deccan commenced operations to Mumbai and Pune on 23 December 2017 under the government's UDAN scheme.

Ozar Air Force Station
The 11 Base Repair Depot, one of the eight base repair depots of the Indian Air Force under overall control and supervision of the Maintenance Command, Nashik is based at the airport. It was established in 1975 and is an ISO 9001:2000 certified maintenance facility. It conducts overhaul programmes for the IAF's MiG-21 (FL, BIS), MiG-23s and MiG-29s.

Terminal
The new terminal building, spread over 22 acres with 8,267 sq.m. built-up area can accommodate 300 passengers. The adjoining apron can handle up to six aircraft. The groundbreaking ceremony of the terminal was performed by the then PWD Minister and Guardian Minister, Chhagan Bhujbal, on 2 January 2012, and the terminal was inaugurated on 3 March 2014 by the then Union Minister for the Heavy Industries and Public Enterprises, Praful Patel. The facilities include departure lobby, check-in counters, security, holding and VIP areas, retail, airport administration and airlines offices, flying and ground crew services, physically challenged friendly and childcare facilities, and dedicated smoking areas. The airport boasts of modern systems like integrated baggage handling, Flight information display systems (FIDS), CCTVs, public address and voice annunciation systems, access control, Building Management System (BMS), Fire and Safety Systems, and Terminal Control Center.

Airlines and destinations

References

External links
 Website for Nasik Air Cargo

Airports in Maharashtra
Transport in Nashik
Buildings and structures in Nashik
Airports established in 1964
1964 establishments in Maharashtra
20th-century architecture in India